Craig Norris is a Canadian rock singer and radio personality. He is the lead singer for The Kramdens, and is also a host on CBC Radio. Originally heard on CBC Radio 3, including the network's weekly record chart show The R3-30, he was also a host of the CBC Radio One program Laugh Out Loud. In the summer season of 2011 he also hosted Know Your Rights, a show that explored the parameters of human rights in Canada.

In 2013, he became the host of The Morning Edition, CBC Radio One's new local morning program on CBLA-FM-2 in the Kitchener-Waterloo market, launching on March 11, 2013. He also hosts the Ontario-themed weekend music program In the Key of C, which airs provincewide except in the Greater Toronto Area.

References

External links
 Craig Norris

Year of birth missing (living people)
Living people
Musicians from Guelph
Canadian rock singers
Canadian male singers
Canadian indie rock musicians
CBC Radio hosts
Canadian talk radio hosts